Haematostaphis is a genus of flowering plants belonging to the family Anacardiaceae.

Its native range is Western Tropical Africa to Sudan.

Species:
 Haematostaphis barteri Hook.f.

References

Anacardiaceae
Anacardiaceae genera